Humibacillus xanthopallidus is a species of Gram positive, nonmotile, non-sporeforming bacteria. The bacteria are strictly aerobic and mesophilic. Cells of the genus are irregular rods. Humibacillus xanthopallidus, was originally isolated from both a paddy field in Saitama Prefecture, Japan and from a sediment collected from Lake Jusanko, Aomori Prefecture, Japan.

References

Bacteria described in 2008
Intrasporangiaceae
Monotypic bacteria genera